Nealan van Heerden (born 27 January 1997) is a South African first-class cricketer. He made his first-class debut for Free State on 16 February 2017. He made his Twenty20 debut for Free State in the 2017 Africa T20 Cup on 8 September 2017. In April 2021, he was named in Free State's squad, ahead of the 2021–22 cricket season in South Africa.

References

External links
 

1997 births
Living people
South African cricketers
Free State cricketers
Place of birth missing (living people)